

Northern Transvaal results in the 1989 Currie cup

Statistics

1989 Currie cup log position

1988 - 1989 results summary (including play off matches)

Northern Transvaal
1989